General Laurie may refer to:

Sir John Laurie, 6th Baronet (1892−1983), British Army major general
Percy Laurie (1880–1962), British Army brigadier general
Sir Robert Laurie, 5th Baronet (c. 1738–1804), British Army general

See also
Émile Laure (1881–1957), French Army general